In Greek mythology, Cymopoleia or Cymopolia (Ancient Greek: Κυμοπόλεια Kymopoleia) was a daughter of sea god Poseidon and the wife of Briareus, one of the three Hundred-Handers. Her only known mention occurs in the Hesiodic Theogony.

Notes

References
 Gantz, Timothy, Early Greek Myth: A Guide to Literary and Artistic Sources, Johns Hopkins University Press, 1996, Two volumes:  (Vol. 1),  (Vol. 2).
 Hesiod, Theogony, in Hesiod, Theogony, Works and Days, Testimonia, Edited and translated by Glenn W. Most. Loeb Classical Library No. 57. Cambridge, Massachusetts, Harvard University Press, 2018. . Online version at Harvard University Press.
 West, M. L. (1966), Hesiod: Theogony, Oxford University Press. .

Children of Poseidon
Demigods in classical mythology